Ash London is an Australian radio and television personality.

Career

Television 
In 2012, London was appointed co-host of Eleven's music video show The Loop with Scott Tweedie. She resigned in 2015 to pursue a career in radio,

In 2018, Ash co-hosted Network Ten's Game of Games with Grant Denyer.

She has been a guest on multiple episodes of Have You Been Paying Attention? and Celebrity Name Game.

Radio 
in October 2014, London was appointed co-host of the Hit Network's Shazam Top 20 Countdown with Angus O'Loughlin. She remained in the position until she resigned in December 2015.

In October 2016, Ash returned to radio to host Ash London LIVE, a music-based show broadcast nightly on the Hit Network and will finish up on Friday 3 September 2021.

In September 2018, London began filling in on 2Day FM's breakfast show alongside Ed Kavalee and Grant Denyer, after the departure of co-host Em Rusciano. In December, after three months of filling in, Ash was permanently appointed as a co-host with the show renamed to Grant, Ed & Ash. The show aired for 18 months before being cancelled in August 2019.

In August 2021, London announced her resignation from the Hit Network after 5 years with the network. Throughout her time at the network has hosted Australian-music focussed program Ash London LIVE on-and-off for the past five years, and also had a stint on 2Day FM breakfast alongside Grant Denyer and Ed Kavalee. Ash London LIVE aired for the last time on 3 September.

In June 2022, it was announced that London will fill in on the KIIS Network's Will & Woody whilst Will McMahon is on paternity leave.

References

Australian radio personalities
Australian television personalities
Women television personalities
Year of birth missing (living people)
Living people